Rosemary Daniell (born November 29, 1935) is an American second-wave feminist poet and author. She is best known for her controversial poetry collection, A Sexual Tour of the Deep South and memoirs Fatal Flowers: On Sin, Sex, and Suicide in the Deep South and Sleeping with Soldiers: In Search of the Macho Man.

Early life and education 
Born Rosemary Hughes in Atlanta, Georgia, on November 29, 1935, Daniell is the older of two daughters born to Melissa Ruth Connell and Parker McDonald Hughes. After the family moved to Tucker, Georgia, Daniell dropped out of Tucker High School at age 16 to marry her first husband Laurens Ramos.

Career 

Daniell has authored ten books of poetry, creative nonfiction, and fiction, has appeared on national television and radio shows, and has lectured at numerous literary venues. Her work has been featured in more than 32 literary and small press publications, 20 magazines, and 19 anthologies, as well as theater and mixed media productions. Daniell's 1969 article The Feminine Frustration was published in the June 1970 issue of Atlanta Magazine, the first trade magazine article to cover second-wave feminism in the Southeast.

In 1975, Daniell's mother committed suicide and her father died of cancer. That same year, she published her first book of poetry, A Sexual Tour of the Deep South, a book that stirred controversy in the Bible Belt and was hailed by Rolling Stone magazine as one of the best works of feminist literature of the era. While her poetry collection The Feathered Trees, published the following year, focused mostly on nature, Daniell's subsequent book Fort Bragg & Other Points South (1988) saw her return to writing about women's sexual experiences.

While Daniell criticizes the traditional role of the Southern woman, her writing does not attack the South, but rather exposes the mythology of the Southern woman and provides a reinterpretation of the South. She breaks the silence about women's private lives - anger and sex - and in the process addresses the myth of the South as a region of moral degeneration and libido.

Her first memoir, Fatal Flowers: On Sin, Sex, and Suicide in the Deep South (1980), was partially inspired by both her mother's unrealized talents as a writer and her subsequent suicide. Fatal Flowers describes the year Daniell's parents died and her extended period of sexual experimentation following the loss, ending when she founded Zona Rosa and met the man who was to become her fourth husband. Daniell examines the mythology of the Southern woman: materialistic, often the wife of a powerful man, always serving as a perfect hostess, and one loyal to her home and land. She argues that these stereotypes both inhibit women's freedom and stunt their personal growth, thus hindering the expression of their creativity.

Daniell's second memoir, Sleeping with Soldiers (1985), draws from her 1979 experience working as one of the first two women on an oil rig off the coast of Savannah. She describes the men she's attracted to as "macho men": physically strong and courageous risk-takers who stay true to their opinions and the Southern ideal of masculinity, or as she said in defense of Southern men on a talk show in Toronto, those "who communicate viscerally and emotionally rather than intellectually."

A self-described "high-school dropout," Daniell has said of her work: "During a bout with postpartum depression, I saw the flyer listing a Modern Poetry class in Emory University's continuing education program, and I knew I — a high school dropout and literary virgin who had never heard of T.S. Eliot or Emily Dickinson — was meant to be there. Before long, because of her poetry, she was invited to join a poetry group made up primarily of Emory professors, and which the well-known poet James Dickey soon joined to lead. When I began reading some new poets - Anne Sexton, Sylvia Plath - [I] was stunned by both their virtuosity and their accuracy. But when I told Dickey how much I liked these new poets, he was angry, saying, They're just shrill, hysterical females who write about throwing their abortions in the gutter. Then I began to ask, who is Dickey - or any man - to say what is right about women's experiences? From that point forward my writing began to change… I now began to write directly out of my experience as a woman, including my experiences of anger and sexuality. I broke the taboo with which I and all the Southern women I knew had been brought up: never speak directly about anger or sexuality." Daniell's contributions to second-wave feminism are profiled in the book Feminists Who Changed America,1963-1975 by Barbara J. Love, editor and forward by Nancy F. Cott.
In 1981, Danielll founded a series of creative writing workshops for women in Savannah, Georgia. Two years later, she named the workshops Zona Rosa, Spanish for the "pink zone," which later became an LLC. Daniell's first book about the workshops, The Woman Who Spilled Words All Over Herself: Writing and the Zona Rosa Way, was published by Faber and Faber in 1997; her second book about the writing workshops, Secrets of the Zona Rosa: How Writing (and Sisterhood) Can Change Women's Lives, was published by Henry Holt and Company, 2006.

Daniell was awarded the Governor's Award in the Humanities in 2008 for her contributions to Georgia's literary heritage.

Teaching and Zona Rosa

In the 1970s, Daniell became involved in activities that encouraged the appreciation of writers and writing. During 1971 and 1972, she served as Director of Poetry in the Schools, a joint program of the National Endowment for the Arts and the Georgia State Council for the Arts, a national program that gave students the opportunity to work with published poets. During that time, she initiated and led writing workshops in the Georgia Correctional Institute for Women, Hardwick, Georgia, and the Wyoming Women's Center in Lusk, Wyoming, as well as in detention centers, a high school for unwed mothers, and the state hospital for the mentally disabled in Milledgeville, Georgia.

Daniell's Zona Rosa writing workshops serve thousands of people across America and Europe and have been profiled by People and Southern Living. To date, over 350 Zona Rosans and counting have become published authors, and many have won awards for their writing.  Award winning author Amanda C. Gable workshopped her award-winning first novel, The Confederate General Rides North, in the Atlanta Zona Rosa group. John Berendt would drop by the Savannah Zona Rosa group for feedback on the latest chapter of what became Midnight in the Garden of Good and Evil, and Pat Conroy was a frequent visitor, as is New York Times best-selling author Bruce Feiler.

Bibliography

Poetry 
 A Sexual Tour of the Deep South (Push Button Publishing, 1994; Holt, Rinehart and Winston, 1975)
 The Feathered Trees (a chapbook; Sweetwater Press; 1976).
 Fort Bragg & Other Points South (Henry Holt and Company, 1988). 
 The Murderous Sky: Poems of Madness & Mercy, (Lavender Ink Press, 2021).

Nonfiction 
 Fatal Flowers: On Sin, Sex & Suicide in the Deep South (memoir; Hill Street Press, 1999; Henry Holt and Company, 1989; Avon Books, 1981; Holt, Rinehart, and Winston, 1980).
 Sleeping with Soldiers (memoir; Hill Street Press, Warner Books, 1986; Granada, England, 1986; Edizioni Frassinelli, Italy, 1986; Holt, Rinehart and Winston, 1985).
 The Woman Who Spilled Words All Over Herself: Writing & Living the Zona Rosa Way, (Faber & Faber, 1997; paper, 1998).
 Confessions of a (Female) Chauvinist (essays; Hill Street Press, 2001)
 Secrets of the Zona Rosa:  How Writing (and Sisterhood) Can Change Women's Lives, (Henry Holt and Company, 2006)

Fiction 

 The Hurricane Season, (William Morrow & Company, 1992)

Literary and small press – Poetry 
 The Atlantic Monthly: "Bridal Luncheon;" Volume 214, No. 2; August 1964.
 Poetry Northwest: "Black Animals," "Green Frogs," and "Ducks;" Volume V, Number 5; Spring, 1964.
 Shenandoah: The Washington and Lee University Review:" "The Mountain Was My Father;" Summer, 1965.
 Poem:  "The Feathered Trees," "The Birthday," "In the Waiting Room of a Mental Hospital," and "The Wild Birds;" No. 3-4, November 1968. "The Brown Slopes of Innocence," No. 1, November 1967.
 The Virginia Quarterly Review: "The Creek;" Volume 43, Number l; Winter, 1967
 The Great Speckled Bird: "The Doll;" October 11, 1970. Also, "The Distant War" and "How to Make Your Own Napalm;" May 5, 1969. Also, "A French Kiss for Inez Garcia." 
 South and West: "Garden Club Meeting;" Volume 9, No. l; Summer, 1970. "Coffee Break" and "Tea Party;" Volume 7, No. 4; Spring, 1969. 
 TriQuarterly: "Tiger Lilies;" Number Fifteen; Spring, 1969. 
 Descant: "Roman Forms in America" and "The Swimmer;" Volume Thirteen, Number Four; Summer, 1969. 
 The Literary Review: "Facing Eros" and "Jack and I in Georgia: 1945;" Summer, 1969. 
 The Dekalb Literary Arts Journal:  "April in Georgia, 1971;"1972. "Georgia Road" and "The Quickening;" Volume 1, Number l; Fall, 1966. 
 Archon: Literary Art Magazine of Emory University:" "Tulips;" Spring, 1971. 
 The New Orleans Review:  "A Week in February," "Shiksa," and "Declaration Day;" Volume 4, No. 4, 1975. "The State of Georgia" and "Talking of Stars;" Volume 4, No. 3; 1974. "The Angel Stud." Volume 3, No. 2; 1973.   "Over Chattanooga," Volume 3, No. 4; 1973. "The Bible Salesman;" Volume 3, No. 1; 1972. 
 The New York Quarterly: "I Want;" Number 16, 1974. "What's Happening;" Number 13, Winter, 1973. 
 The Drunken Boat: "Oh, Men!" Number 1, 1973. 
 The Georgia State University Review, 1977-78: "Blood Brother." 
 Negative Capability: "Valentine's Day, 1982;" Volume VII, Numbers I & II, 1987. "Sewing;" Volume II, Number IV, Fall, 1982. 
 Paintbrush: "The Color of Halcyon Days" and "Yellow Birds;" Volume X, Nos. 19 & 20, Spring & Autumn, 1983. 
 The Chattahoochee Review: "The Power of Love" and "Accommodations;" Volume XVII - Number 3, Spring, 1997. "Sex in Savannah" and "A Lisp for Myth Amerika;" Volume V - Number 4, Summer, 1985. "A Pile of Chopped Pine Logs" and "Of Money and Class, and the Plight of the Working Man;" Volume V - Number 3, Spring, 1985. 
 The American Voice:  "Values, or the Christ of the White Shag Carpet," No. 40, Summer, 1996; "Chocolate Eclairs," No. 33, Summer, 1994; "Fort Bragg," No. 5, Winter, 1986. "Loss of the Soul & Other Sicknesses;" No. 3, Summer, 1986. 
 Arrival: "Craving Hollywood;" Summer, 1987. 
 Explicit Lyrics:  "Portrait: Boy with Dog;" Number One, 1999.
 Caprice:  "The Cowgirl Tells Her Daughter about Life," "The Elephant Maiden," Fall, 1996; "The Chef;" March 1990.
 Kalliope: "Southern Suttee, or What Grandmother Knew," Winter, 2001; "Death of the Drum Fish," "Intimate Terrorists" (nominated for Pushcart Prize); Fall, 1996.
 Arts & Letters:  "What Keith the Hunter Says About the Deer in the Hills" and "For Jesus, Eyes Blazing;" Spring, 2002. 
 Web Del Sol, an online chapbook of selected poems, 2002
 The Copenhagen Review: "Rooms, or the Comfort of Enclosed Spaces," "One-Eyed Jack," "Miracles Are Like That;" No. Three, 2008.
 The Double Dealer: "Sacred Things," 2009
 Minerva Rising: "When I Had Balls for a Day," 2016

Literary and small press – prose 
 Teachers & Writers Collaborative: "My High School English Teacher," January–February, 1986.
 Helicon Nine: "A Piece of White Satin" (short story); Number 17/18, 1987
 Habersham Review: "Of Cudden Lily Rising" (short story); Volume I, Number 2; Spring, 1992.

Literary and small press publications  – other 

 Editor: Dracula and Other Poems, An Anthology of Poems by Students in Georgia Schools. Also: Joy to the Word!, a pamphlet describing my experiences as poet in residence in Georgia schools; printed by the Georgia Council for the Arts; 1973.
 Paintbrush: Interview with Rosemary Daniell; Volume III, Number 5; Spring 1976.
 Negative Capability: Interview with Rosemary Daniell, Volume III, Number IV; Fall 1983.
 Habersham Review: Interview with Rosemary Daniell, Volume I, Number 2; Spring, 1992.
 Kalliope:  Interview with Rosemary Daniell; Fall, Number 3, 1996.
 The Chattahoochee Review:  Interview with Rosemary Daniell; Volume XVII - Number 3, Spring, 1997.

Anthologies 
 We Become New: Poems by Contemporary American Women: "Girl Friends," "Before the Fall," "To a Family Man in His Family Room," and "I Want"(poems); Bantam Press, 1976. 
 Sojourner: "Girl Friends" (a poem); Interart Center, New York City; 1976. 
 Cafe at Saint Marks: The Apalachee Poets: "Liturgy" (a poem); The Apalachee Poetry Center, Tallahassee, Florida; 1976. 
 White Trash: "The Operation" and "A Week in February" (poems); The New South Company, 1976. 
 The Callenwolde Poets: "The Brown Slopes of Innocence" The Tinhorn Press; 1976.
 Southern Poetry: The Seventies: "Of Jayne Mansfield, Flannery O'Connor, My Mother & Me;" University of North Carolina Press, 1977. 
 Finished Product: An Anthology of Atlanta Poets: "Of Jayne Mansfield, Flannery O'Connor, My Mother & Me;" The Poetry Factory, 1978. 
 Contemporary Southern Poetry: "Of Jayne Mansfield, Flannery O'Connor, My Mother & Me" (a poem); University of Louisiana Press, 1980. 
 Woman Poet: The South: "A Kiss for Inez Garcia" (a poem); Women-in-Literature, Inc., 1989. 
 Lips Unsealed: Confidences from Contemporary Women Writers: "Stains on a Piece of White Satin" (fiction) and "In Search of the Macho Man" (memoir); Capra Press, 1990. 
 Touching Fire: A Collection of Erotic Writing by Women: "Talking of Stars" (a poem); Crossing Press, 1990. 
 Georgia Voices: Fiction Edited by Hugh Ruppersburge; University of Georgia Press, 1992.
 The Time of Our Lives: "Sleeping With Soldiers" (an excerpt); The Crossing Press, 1993. 
 Literary Savannah, edited by Patrick Allen and published by Hill Street Press, 1998.
 Georgia Voices: Poetry Edited by Hugh Ruppersburge; University of Georgia Press, 2000.
 How I Learned to Cook: Edited by Margot Perin; Jeremy P. Tarcher, 2004.
 Stirring Up a Storm; Edited by Marilyn Jaye Lewis; Thunder's Mouth Press, 2005.
 Desire: Women Write About Wanting; Edited by Lisa Solod Warren. Seal, Press, 2007.
 Sugar in My Bowl: Real Women Write About Real Sex; Edited by Erica Jong. Ecco/ Harper Collins, 2011.

Trade/other publications 

 Atlanta Gazette:  Mesas to Magnolias: A Southern Woman in the West;" August 1977.
 Playgirl: "In Search of the Macho Man," December 1982.
 Harper's Bazaar: "The Lure of the Hard Hat," November 1984.
 Mademoiselle: "Sinfully Sexy: 14 Red-Hot Men," March 1986
 Atlanta Journal-Constitution: "A Family Christmas in the West," December 25, 1986. "Growing up Southern: Of Dirt and Flowers of All Kinds;" July 22, 1984. 
 Us: "She's in the Army Now," January 1987. "Down South: The Jim Williams Murder Trials," May 1986. "Suicide in Coral Springs: The Tina Mancini Story," June 1987
 "The Drinking Season," January 1987; "The Southern Body," October 1986.
 Mother Jones: "Cora Lee Johnson: Heroes for Hard Times," January 1988.   Excerpt, Sleeping With Soldiers; January 1985. "Secrets, Shackles and Shame: The Ginny Foat Trial:" July 1984. "Southern Discomfort: Slipping Down the Economic Slopes in Savannah;" November 1984. 
 Southern:  "Blood, Heat, Mayhem: A Memoir;" September 1988.
 Self: "The Right Guy;" September 1988." 
 Diversion: "City Diary, Savannah;" October 1988. "Mexico's Spicy Colonial Trail," October 1989. 
 Physicians Lifestyle:   "An Insider's Guide to Savannah,"  April 1990. 
 Geo (German Edition): "Blood, Heat, Mayhem: a Memoir;" December 1991.
 Changes: "In the Heart of the Heart of Darkness: When Suicide Runs in the Family;" April 1992. "Codependency: When Loves Goes Haywire;" February 1992.
 The Chicago Tribune: "The Tailhook Incident;" September 1992
 Golden Isles Magazine: The Hurricane Season (an excerpt); October 1992. 
 Travel and Leisure: "Savannah: City of Secrets and Seduction;" April 1993. 
 Men's Fitness:  "Why I Like Tough Guys (the Real Kind);" 1996
 Southern Living: "Georgia, My State of Everything;" 1998
 Atlanta: "Before and After: The Pill and Me," June 2000; "The Gifts the Poet Gave Me (a memoir of James Dickey)," January 1998; "Bad Girls & Artists: The Price Southern Women Pay for Breaking the Rules," October 1997. "In Search of the New Southern Belle," January 1985."Living the Fairy Tale by the Sea," July 1984. "Travel Reachable Beaches," June 1984; "Women's Liberation: The Feminine Frustration," June 1970. Also, "Culture: The Georgia Arts Council;" "James Dickey: A Strong, Clean Wind;" Human Dynamics: Enhancing the Inner Man; "The Yerkes Primate Center: Vanguard in the Human Jungle;" 1966-76. 
 Atlanta Woman: "The Only Risk in Life Is Not Taking One;" premiere issue, 2002.

Book reviews 
 New York Native: Women Folks: Growing up Down South, by Shirley Abbott; May 20, 1984.
 Atlanta: Beyond Power: On Women, Men, Morals, by Marilyn French; January 1986. An Indian Attachment, by Sarah Lloyd; April 1985. 
 The Myth of Women's Masochism by Paula Caplan, November 3, 1985. 
 The Atlanta Journal-Constitution: Shooting Rats at the Bibb County Dump (poems) by David Bottoms; June 8, 1980. Meditations in an Emergency (poems) by Frank O'Hara. Also, over twenty reviews of other books of contemporary poetry by such poets as Diane Wakoski, Erica Jong, and Robert Duncan; 1966-72.
 The Philadelphia Inquirer: Collected Stories by Carson McCullers; September 20, 1987. The Myth of Women's Masochism by Paula Caplan, November 3, 1985.
 New York Woman: Self-Consciousness by John Updike, This Boy's Life by Tobias Wolff: April 1989. Wordstruck by Robert MacNeil. Loving Rachel  by Jane Bernsteln; November, 1988. Grown Up Fast: A True Story of Teenage Life in Suburban American by Betsy Israel; September, 1988.
 Newsday: Any Woman's Blues by Erica Jong; January 21, 1990.  
 New York Times Book Review: "Rootie Kazootie" by Lawrence Naumoff; March 11, 1990. Heart of the Country by Fay Weldon; December 11, 1988. Zami: A New Spelling of My Name and Chosen Poems Old and New by Audre Lorde; December 19, 1982. Miss Undine's Living Room by James Wilcox; October 18, 1988. Among Birches by Rebecca Hill, April 27, 1986. 
 Los Angeles Times Book Review: Southern Daughter: The Life of Margaret Mitchell by Darden Asbury Pyron; September 1992.

Grants and Awards 

 Harcourt, Brace & World Fellowship in Poetry; Writers' Conference of the University of Colorado; summer, 1969
 National Endowment for the Arts grant for poetry 1974 - 75
 The New Orleans Review: Annual Poetry Award, 1975
 The Ossabaw Foundation; residency; spring, 1979
 National Endowment for the Arts grant for fiction; 1981–82
 Georgia Council for the Arts and Humanities: Artist-Initiated Grant in Fiction; 1987
 The Ucross Foundation; residency; August 1998; September 1993
 The Corporation of Yaddo; residency; August 1994.
 The Palimpsest Prize: Hill Street Press for a most-requested out-of-print book: Fatal Flowers:  On Sin, Sex, and Suicide in the Deep South; Fall, 1999.
 The Writers' Colony at Dairy Hollow; residencies; August 2001, 2002, 2003, 2004, 2005, 2006, 2007, 2008
 Governor's Award for the Arts and Humanities for her contributions to Georgia's literary heritage, 2008
 William Faulkner-William Wisdom competition, Gold Medal, Poetry;  2009 
 Hambidge Center for the Arts; residency; August 2016, 2015, 2013
 William Faulkner-William Wisdom, Gold Medal, Poetry Collection: The Murderous Sky; 2019
 William Faulkner-William Wisdom competition; Gold Medal, Non-fiction Book: My Beautiful Tigers: Forty Years as The Mother of an Opioid Addicted Daughter and a Schizophrenic Son, 2020

Mixed media 

 To the Machine I Love: Writer-director-actor; film, slides, electronic sound, poetry, and dance; produced with funds granted through the Georgia Council for the Arts; presented in the Studio Theater of the Atlanta Cultural Center, 1969.
 Photolistographs, with photographer Jim Holmes; Savannah Fine Arts Center; Savannah, Georgia; 1993.
 Southern Icons: Photographs by Southern photographers with text by Southern authors, 2016

References

External links
The Parker Ranch, "Becoming the Writer Your Were Meant to Be," May 17 through May 19, 2019, North Georgia Mountains Bed and Breakfast
Books by Rosemary Daniell and Complete Book Reviews, Publishers Weekly Books by Rosemary Daniell and Complete Book Reviews
The Soul of Zona – Rosemary Daniell (7 September 2011) The Soul of Zona Rosa - Rosemary Daniell
Georgia Tech (17 February 2011) Poetry@Tech: Rosemary Daniell Poetry@Tech: Rosemary Daniell
Bruce Feiler at Zona Rosa Retreat (17 September 2018) Bruce Feiler at Zona Rosa Retreat
Atlanta Upper Westside RosemaryDaniell
Publishers Weekly, Books by Rosemary Daniell and Complete Book Reviews Books by Rosemary Daniell and Complete Book Reviews
Knott, Barbara, The Grapevine Art & Soul Salon, "Essence of Rosemary," Presentations
Web Del Sol, "Rosemary Daniell," Web Del Sol Chapbook Series
News Article-Coastal Carolina University, "Author Rosemary Daniell gives reading at Coastal," March 9, 2005, news-article - Coastal Carolina University Retrieved June 10, 2021.
Daniell, Rosemary (15 February 2021) Google Books Author The Murderous Sky Retrieved 31 March 2021.

1935 births
20th-century American memoirists
21st-century American memoirists
20th-century American poets
21st-century American poets
Writers from Atlanta
American women memoirists
American women poets
Living people
20th-century American women writers
21st-century American women writers
People from Tucker, Georgia
Poets from Georgia (U.S. state)